Tangerines ( Mandarinebi) is a 2013 Estonian-Georgian film directed, produced and written by Zaza Urushadze. Set during the 1992–1993 War in Abkhazia, the film is a morality tale addressing issues of conflict, reconciliation and pacifism. It was filmed in Guria, Georgia.

It was nominated for the Best Foreign Language Film awards at the 87th Academy Awards and the 72nd Golden Globe Awards, losing the former to the Polish film Ida (2013) and the latter to the Russian film Leviathan(2014).

Plot 
In a rural village of ethnic Estonians in Abkhazia, a Russian-backed separatist region in the newly independent Georgia, Ivo (Lembit Ulfsak) and his friend Margus (Elmo Nüganen) are the only two of their once large community who have not fled for Estonia after the outbreak of the war. Margus has delayed leaving until he can harvest his lucrative tangerine crop. Ivo, a carpenter, is attempting to make enough wooden crates to hold all the unpicked tangerines, but doesn't reveal his reasons for staying.

Two Chechen mercenaries fighting alongside the Abkhaz separatists show up and demand food from Ivo before leaving peacefully. However, they get into a firefight with Georgian Army soldiers in front of Margus' house, leaving only one alive from each side. Ahmed (Giorgi Nakashidze), the surviving Chechen, and Nika (Mikheil Meskhi), a Georgian volunteer, are both gravely wounded, and Ivo brings them into his home to nurse them back to health.

While both vow to kill each other once they have the strength, Ivo secures a pledge from each to not enact any vengeance under his roof. A great deal of tension ensues between the two enemies as they begin to recover over many days in the same tiny house. Slowly, the two begin to recognize the humanity and honor in each other. Under the moral tutelage of the senior and wise Ivo, the two move from hatred and antagonism, to respect and camaraderie.

When Abkhaz soldiers come to the house, Ivo convinces Ahmed to tell them that Nika is also a fellow Chechen, but whose head wound has left him unable to speak.

After a local military patrol fails to show to harvest the tangerines as planned, Margus is desperate. The Abkhaz soldiers, having set up camp nearby, promise to help harvest the tangerines in two days. That night, however, shelling hits the village, destroying Margus' property. Ahmed offers Margus a large wad of cash that he has made from being a mercenary, but Margus refuses money "made like that".

Russian troops allied to the Abkhaz and Chechens later drive up to Ivo's house, finding Ahmed and Margus outside, and falsely accuse Ahmed of being Georgian. They are about to execute him when Nika shoots them from the house with a rifle. In the firefight, Margus is killed by Russian gunfire. Ahmed and Nika partner to fight the Russians, but Nika is shot dead by a wounded Russian before Ahmed finishes off Nika's killer.

Ivo and Ahmed bury Margus and Nika. Ivo reveals that Nika's body lies next to that of his own son, who was killed when the war broke out in August 1992. Ivo tells Ahmed that if he had died instead of Nika, Ivo would have buried Ahmed next to his son as well. Ahmed tells Ivo that he misses his own family, and begins his drive home to a Chechnya that will be plunged into a similar bloody war less than two years later. He listens to a cassette tape of Georgian music that belonged to Nika.

Cast

 Lembit Ulfsak as Ivo, an elderly Estonian farmer living in Abkhazia. He is a hawk-faced older fellow, who never hesitates; he instantly helps others, regardless of their "side" in this misery.
 Giorgi Nakashidze as Ahmed, a wounded Chechen soldier, slightly wounded but eager to "kill that scumbag in the next room!" Ivo eventually gets him to promise not to kill Nika unless he steps outside the house.
 Elmo Nüganen as Margus, a friend of Ivo, another Estonian farmer, with a tangerine orchard. He wants to make this sale so he can join his family in Estonia.
 Mikheil (Misha) Meskhi as Nika, a wounded Georgian soldier and an ethnic Christian with shrapnel in his head. His hatred for Ahmed is every bit as venomous.

Critical reception 
The film received an 88% rating from review aggregator Rotten Tomatoes based on 66 reviews, with an average rating of 7.40/10. The site's critical consensus reads, "Tangerines impassioned message and the strong work of a solid cast more than make up for the movie's flawed narrative and uneven structure." On Metacritic, the film has a weighted average score of 73 out of 100 based on 18 critics, indicating "generally favorable reviews".

According to the film critic Anthony D'Alessandro, Nüganen drew a parallel to the 2014 Ukraine-Russia Conflict.

Accolades

See also 
List of submissions to the 87th Academy Awards for Best Foreign Language Film
List of Estonian submissions for the Academy Award for Best Foreign Language Film

References

External links 
 Tangerines Allfilm
 
 
 
 
 Estonian-Georgian film Mandariinid (Tangerines) wins prizes in Germany
 'Tangerines': Film Review The Hollywood Reporter, 11/24/2014

2013 multilingual films
2013 films
Estonian multilingual films
Multilingual films from Georgia (country)
2010s Georgian-language films
Estonian-language films
2010s Russian-language films
Films directed by Zaza Urushadze
Films set in Georgia (country)
2013 war drama films
Estonian war drama films
Drama films from Georgia (country)